Legislative coordinator may refer to:
A legislative staffer - see legislative assistant
A governmental affairs professional - see lobbying